BSAC can stand for:
The British Screen Advisory Council
Bit Sliced Arithmetic Coding, audio coding from MPEG-4 Part 3
British South Africa Company, 1889–1965
British Sub-Aqua Club
British Society for Antimicrobial Chemotherapy
Black Swamp Area Council, scouting organisation in Ohio
Benedictine Study and Arts Centre, Ealing, London